Janet Turner (29 September 1936 – 7 April 2015) was a British architectural lighting designer and author. She trained initially as an interior designer.

The Guardian called her "internationally acclaimed as the doyenne of lighting design".

According to the Architects' Journal, she was "A fellow of the RSA and the Chartered Society of Designers, Janet was also an honorary fellow of the Society of Light and Lighting and the Royal Incorporation of Architects in Scotland (RIAS)." In 2014, RIAS gave her a lifetime achievement award “for her services to international lighting design and improving places for people.”

She wrote books and lectured internationally on lighting design.

References

1936 births
2015 deaths
British women architects
British interior designers
Fellows of the Royal Incorporation of Architects in Scotland
Chartered designers